Beyond Fear is an American heavy metal band started in March, 2005 by Tim "Ripper" Owens after he left Judas Priest as a side-project, apart from his former work with Iced Earth.

History
The band was started largely to satisfy Owens' desire to be involved in the song writing on a heavy metal album, something denied to him on most of his previous musical ventures. Writing duties are split between Owens and guitarist John Comprix. A demo was recorded after a month, and the debut album was released about a year later. Later on the same year as their debut album was released guitarist Dwayne Bihary quit the band, with the reasons being kept private.

Owens commented on Beyond Fear's next studio album in an interview with Metal Asylum: "It will always be classic metal but I think a lot of the later songs that we recorded for the debut, like “Scream Machine”, became favorites for fans. And lyrics to a song like that were not so serious and more cliché metal lyrics, you know about a metal machine (laughs), so I think some of the new songs may go in that direction. We are still gonna have songs like “Save Me” but I think it will probably have some more aggression. We have been writing now, John Comprix and I, for a while, I have a lot of ideas and melodies in my head that I really can’t use anywhere else (laughs). Its nice I get to use em for Beyond Fear. I mean I have been a writer for many years but I don’t get to do it as much as I would like and Iced Earth just keeps me so busy but its nice that every once and [sic] a while I get to do my thing with Beyond Fear. And we get to take our time with this band and practice together. I mean that’s what I want to hear with all my influences on one album that’s what I like to do with Fear."

Band members 
 Tim "Ripper" Owens - vocals (2005–present)
 John Comprix - rhythm & lead guitar (2005–present)
 Dennis Hayes - bass (2005–present)
 Eric Elkins - drums (2005–present)

Former members 
 Dwayne Bihary - rhythm guitar (2005–2006)

Discography 
 Beyond Fear (2006)

See also
 Iced Earth
 Judas Priest
 Seven Witches
 Winter's Bane
 Yngwie Malmsteen

References

External links 
 Homepage
 Official Brazilian Site
 Tim "Ripper" Owens interviewed by Highwire Daze (2006)

Musical groups established in 2005
Heavy metal musical groups from Ohio
American thrash metal musical groups
American power metal musical groups